The 2020 TK Sparta Prague Open was a women's tennis tournament played on Clay in Prague , Czech Republic, and was part of the 2020 WTA 125K series.

This was the first edition of the tournament and was held from 29 August to 6 September 2020.

Lidziya Marozava and Andreea Mitu won the title, defeating Giulia Gatto-Monticone and Nadia Podoroska in the final, 6–4, 6–4.

Seeds

Draw

Finals

Top half

Bottom half

References

External links
Main Draw

Advantage Cars Prague Open - Doubles